Cykowo  is a village in the administrative district of Gmina Kamieniec, within Grodzisk Wielkopolski County, Greater Poland Voivodeship, in west-central Poland.

The village has a population of 122.

Cykowo lies approximately 5 km south of Kruszwica, 190NaN0 south of Inowrocław, and 490NaN0 south-west of Toruń.

References

Cykowo